The Delhi Sikh Gurdwaras Act of 1971 is a piece of Indian legislation modeled after the Sikh Gurdwaras Act, 1925, which determines the management of Sikh houses of worship within Delhi Union Territory. The 1971 act, more stringent than the 1925 act, required that any Sikhs voting for the Delhi Sikh Gurdwara Management Committee be baptized Sikhs (amritdhari). The legislation thus excluded from voting those Sikhs with shorn hair, and the sahajdhari sikh, persons who generally follow the Sikh lifestyle.

References

Law about religion in India
Sikh politics
Church and state law
Acts of the Parliament of India 1971
1971 in law
 
1971 in religion